Ukhtoceras is a genus of cephalopods included in the nautiloid order Discosorida that lived during the Devonian.  Its range was thought at first to be limited to the Frasnian (Late Devonian).  With discovery of Ukhtoceras hidense from a Lower Devonian shale in Japan the stratigraphic range was thus lowered as well as its geographic range extended. The type is Ukhtoceras asser (Nalivkin 1930). This genus is sometimes put in the Ukhtoceratidae.

References

 Jack Sepkoski's list of cephalopod genera, 2000. 
 Ukhtoceras hidense 
 Ukhtoceras in Fossilworks, 10-15-2014 
 Global names index 

Prehistoric nautiloid genera
Discosorida